The Prussian T 7 was a group of goods tank locomotives of the  Prussian State Railways with an 0-6-0T wheel arrangement. It was not a class in the modern sense of identical locomotives.

History 
In terms of construction, they go back to the mountain locomotives that had been procured by the Rhenish Railway Company (Rheinische Eisenbahn, RE) which had also changed little from the Upper Silesian Railway, (Oberschlesische Eisenbahn, OSE), the K.Dir. Saarbrücken and the Lower Silesian-Märkische Railway (Niederschlesisch-Märkische Eisenbahn, NME). A second, slightly revised series, delivered to the latter company in 1881, proved itself so well that its design was adopted as Diagram (Musterblatt) III-4c in the Prussian Standards. The standardization of the classifications, begun in 1905, summarized all locomotives of this type that were still in existence at that time – both the "standard" and the "pre-standard" – at the Prussian Railways in the group T 7. So 65 locomotives (e.g. 33 of the OSE, 14 of the K.Dir. Saarbrücken, but also 1 of the Thüringische Eisenbahn-Gesellschaft), which were built before the standard were issued, were included in this group. Even after the group was formed, a total of 28 came into the Prussian administration, all of which had construction designs that differed from the diagram sheet. With the 374 copies procured according to the diagram sheet, there is consequently the number of 467 machines that were grouped as T 7 by the Prussian State Railway.

The locomotives were mainly used in heavy shunting. Therefore, they were mainly stationed in the industrial areas. After the First Workd War, among other things, three locomotives were sold to the South German Railway Company (Süddeutsche Eisenbahn-Gesellschaft, SEG), where they were designated as SEG 370–372.

After the First World War, 27 locomotives were ceded to Poland. The Polish State Railways (PKP) classified them as TKh2, none of which were in service during the invasion of Poland.

Some of the state railway locomotives were later taken over by Deutsche Reichsbahn; while in 1923, 137 T7s were still considered as 89 7801 to 89 7937 in the renumbering plan for regional railway locomotives of DRG; in 1925 only 68 examples were classified as the Class 89.78 series in their numbering plan. By 1931, however, all of these machines had been taken out of service.

As a result of the turmoil of the war and post-war period, some machines are said to have reached Belgium and Latvia.

Another machine came in 1930 from the nationalized Bremen Harbour Railway (Hafenbahn Bremen) as 89 7869 to the Deutsche Reichsbahn, was sold to the Kreis Oldenburger Eisenbahn AG and with this came back to the Reichsbahn in 1941. After the Second World War, only a few examples existed on private and works railways.

After the SEG route of the Arnstadt-Ichtershausen Railway was taken over by the Deutsche Reichsbahn in 1949, the SEG 372 was given the number 89 6401. It was in service there until 1956 and was sold to the Erfurt industrial railway, where it remained until it was retired in 1967.

Preserved locomotives 
One copy is preserved in Poland, and one in Luxembourg by Train 1900. 

The Polish locomotive was delivered to Reichsbahndirektion Breslau by the Union Giesserei Königsberg (serial number 537 of 1890) and came to the PKP in 1919 as TKh2-12. After it was preserved in the Warsaw Railway Museum for many years, it was taken to the Jaworzyna Śląska Railway Museum in 2006, where it was visually restored to its original state as "Breslau 1839".

The Luxembourg locomotive was delivered directly from Hanomag (serial number 4018 of 1903) to the German-Luxemburgish Mining and Ironworks (Deutsch-Luxemburgische Bergwerks- und Hütten-AG) in 1903 as No. 12 and was used in the Differdange plant. In 1973 the locomotive was handed over by ARBED to the Association des Musée et Tourisme Ferroviaires (AMTF). After extensive overhaul, the locomotive has been operational again since 2013 and is used on the Pétange – Fond-de-Gras – Bois de Rodange line.

Notes

References

Further reading 

 

0-6-0T locomotives
C n2t locomotives
T 07
Railway locomotives introduced in 1881
Standard gauge locomotives of Germany
Borsig locomotives
Hanomag locomotives
Hohenzollern locomotives
AG Vulcan Stettin locomotives
Freight locomotives
Union Giesserei locomotives